Airworld Aviation Ltd was the in-house charter airline for the travel agent Thomas Cook Group. It began operations in 1994, and was the first British operator of the Airbus A321. It was integrated into Flying Colours in 1998 when Thomas Cook acquired the Flying Colours Leisure Group.

Fleet
 5 Airbus A320
 2 Airbus A321 (2 more on order)

Destinations
The airline served mainly holiday destinations in the Mediterranean area. Its main airport was London Gatwick Airport but operations were also conducted from
 Bristol Airport
 Cardiff Airport
 Manchester Airport
 Glasgow Airport.

See also
 List of defunct airlines of the United Kingdom
 

Defunct airlines of the United Kingdom
Airlines established in 1994
Airlines disestablished in 1998
1994 establishments in the United Kingdom
1998 disestablishments in the United Kingdom